Ashki (also Romanized as Āshkī; also known as Āshīk) is a village in Targavar Rural District, Silvaneh District, Urmia County, West Azerbaijan Province, Iran. At the 2006 census, its population was 65, in 11 families.

References 

Populated places in Urmia County